A Tribute to Buzz Shearman  is a compilation/tribute album by the Canadian rock group Moxy in the band's original incarnation with Buzz Shearman, Earl Johnson, Buddy Caine, Bill Wade  and Terry Juric. The album is a tribute to Moxy vocalist Buzz Shearman (who died in a motorbike accident in 1983) from his wife Valerie.  She was an executive with the indie label Ahed Records Of Canada and released the album. The album collects some of the band's best-known and three previously unreleased songs  called "Trouble", "Eyeballs" and "Highway" with Shearman on vocals. The back cover of the album features a nice testimonial from San Antonio's  disc jockey known as the godfather of rock, Joe Anthony, who wrote : "Buzz had that special quality in his voice that carried a smile and a lift. He penetrated himself into the listeners and was very forceful with them. He gave a definite impression to the music. His passing was untimely, but he gave us so much in such a short span. His music is his legacy".  There are two distinct versions of the album cover one released in 1984 and the second released in 1994 on CD.

Credits
 Buzz Shearman: vocals
 Earl Johnson: Guitar
 Buddy Caine: Guitar
 Bill Wade: drums
 Terry Juric: Bass
 Tommy Bolin: Guitar solo  "Train"
 Jack Douglas : Producer
 Valerie Shearman : Producer
 Mark Smith : Producer

Tracks

Sail on Sail Away – 4:52 – From Moxy I (1975)
Can't You See I'm a Star – 3:36 –  From Moxy I (1974)
Train – 4:37 –  From Moxy I (1975)
Cause There's Another – 3:43 – From Moxy II  (1976)
Trouble – 3:52  – Previously unreleased track (Buzz Shearman)
Change in My Life –  4:37 – From Moxy II  (1976)
Eyeballs –  3:03 – Previously unreleased track (Johnnie Lovesin)
Sweet Reputation (Symphony for Margaret) – 3:54 – From Ridin' High  (1977)
Highway – 4:12  – Previously unreleased track (Earl Johnson)
Riding High – 4:03 – From  Ridin' High (1977)

Reissued

Moxy’s original catalogue of albums were again available starting in 1994 when Valerie Shearman ("Buzz" widow) oversaw the release of all of Moxy's back catalogue of albums on CD through Pacemaker Records, and again in 2003 this time through Unidisc Music Inc.

References

External links
Moxy official website

1984 compilation albums
Tribute albums
Moxy (band) albums
Albums produced by Jack Douglas (record producer)